Augustów may refer to:

 Augustów in Podlaskie Voivodeship (north-east Poland)
 Augustów, Gmina Kowala in Masovian Voivodeship (east-central Poland)
 Augustów, Gmina Pionki in Masovian Voivodeship (east-central Poland)
 Augustów, Kozienice County in Masovian Voivodeship (east-central Poland)
 Augustów, Lower Silesian Voivodeship (south-west Poland)
 Augustów, Opoczno County in Łódź Voivodeship (central Poland)
 Augustów, Pajęczno County in Łódź Voivodeship (central Poland)
 Augustów, Przasnysz County in Masovian Voivodeship (east-central Poland)
 Augustów roundup, a Soviet military operation against partisans and sympathizers after the takeover of Poland